Chevalier D'Aux was a senior French commander who, while leading a foraging party into the Isle of Wight to search for sources of clean water to replenish the stocks of a French fleet, which had just been forced to retire from Portsmouth, was attacked and killed in July 1545 by a group of the local Isle of Wight militia, at Bonchurch.

His body was buried at the local cemetery, and when the war between England and France was concluded, his body was exhumed and conveyed back to his home country in 1548. This event occurred shortly after a French attempt to capture the Isle of Wight, an invasion which was concluded by the English victory at the Battle of Bonchurch.  This time, however, as stated, it was not another attempt by the French to try and conquer the island, but to try and collect water for the return journey home.

Military history of the Isle of Wight